ʻAbdul-Ḥusayn Nūshīn Kohrāsāni (11 February 1907 – 2 May 1971) was an Iranian playwright, theatre director and translator. He was one of the first people who introduced western style theatre to Iran.

He was also, along many other intellectuals and writers, one of the founders of the Tudeh Party of Iran.

References

External link

1907 births
1971 deaths
Iranian theatre directors
Iranian dramatists and playwrights
Iranian translators
20th-century translators
Shahnameh Researchers
Iranian exiles
Central Committee of the Tudeh Party of Iran members